The Scout and Guide movement in the Republic of the Congo is served by at least thirteen associations. Five of them form the Conseil du Scoutisme congolais (Council of the Congolese Scout Mouvement):
 Association des Scouts et Guides du Congo, member of the World Association of Girl Guides and Girl Scouts
 Association des Eclaireurs kimbanguistes du Congo (Kimbanguist)
 Eclaireurs pluralistes du Congo
 Eclaireurs salutistes du Congo (Salvation Army)
 Eclaireurs unionistes du Congo (Protestant)

Among the independent organizations are:
 Eclaireurs communautaires du Congo
 Eclaireurs d'Afrique
 Eclaireurs du Congo
 Eclaireurs Louzolo Amour
 Eclaireurs neutres du Congo (interreligious)
 Eclaireuses et Eclaireurs libres du Congo-Brazzaville (laic)

There is no national organization that is yet recognized by the World Organization of the Scout Movement.

History
Scouting was founded in French Equatorial Africa in 1941, but was banned during the long Marxist period. Guiding was introduced to the Republic of the Congo in 1927, and became a member of the World Association of Girl Guides and Girl Scouts in 1957, and again in 1996 after the renewal of the organization.

The Eclaireurs Neutres du Congo were founded by the Eclaireurs Neutres de France, a French non-aligned Scouting organization, in 2004.

Motto
The Scout Motto is Sois Prêt (Be Prepared) or Toujours Prêt (Always Prepared) in French, depending on the organization.

Emblems

See also

Scouting and Guiding in the Democratic Republic of the Congo

References

External links
 Website on Scouting in the Republic of the Congo 
 Conseil du Scoutisme congolais 
 Eclaireurs Louzolo Amour 
 Eclaireurs salutistes du Congo 
 Eclaireuses et Eclaireurs libres du Congo-Brazzaville 

Congo, Republic of the
Youth organisations based in the Republic of the Congo
Youth organizations established in 1941